The Bull of Olivera is a 1921 German silent historical drama film directed by Erich Schönfelder and starring Emil Jannings. It was shot at the Tempelhof Studios in Berlin. The film's art direction was by Kurt Richter. It premiered at the Ufa-Palast am Zoo.

Cast

References

External links

1920s historical films
German historical films
Films of the Weimar Republic
Films directed by Erich Schönfelder
German silent feature films
UFA GmbH films
Films set in Spain
Films set in the 1800s
Napoleonic Wars films
Depictions of Napoleon on film
German films based on plays
German black-and-white films
1920s German films